Kisielina is a river in Poland. It flows for 41,37 km (25,7 mi) and feeds off a catchment area of 166,2 km² (64,2 sq mi) before feeding itself into the Vistula, being its right bank tributary.

It is joined by its tributaries: Pokrzywka, Upust (Ulga, right) and Zabawski Ditch (right).

The partial regulation of riverbed from Sufczyn to Biadoliny Szlacheckie took place from 2002 to 2005.

See also
 List of rivers of Poland

References

Rivers of Poland
Rivers of Lesser Poland Voivodeship